Algolake was a self-unloading bulk carrier owned and operated by Algoma Central. The ship entered service in 1977 on the  Saint Lawrence Seaway. In 1994, the ship ran aground in the St. Lawrence River off Quebec. The ship was laid up for scrapping in 2018, renamed Gola and was later scrapped in Aliağa, Turkey.

Description
Algolake was constructed to seawaymax dimensions. The vessel is powered by two diesel engines creating  driving one shaft enclosed in a kort nozzle. Algolake has a single superstructure in the stern.

Service history
Algolake was a bulk carrier owned by Algoma Central. She was launched by Collingwood Shipyards at Collingwood, Ontario on 29 October 1976—after lake freighters stopped being built with a distinctive superstructure incorporating the ship's bridge, right up in the bow, and another, over the ship's engines, right in the stern. The ship was completed in April 1977 and entered service on the Saint Lawrence Seaway. Algolake departed on her maiden voyage on 17 April 1977.

On 23 September 1994, Algolake was headed to Detroit, Michigan with a load of iron ore when the ship ran aground in the St. Lawrence River. The vessel was sailing at  when Algolake ran aground, suffering some damage to her hull. However, no one was injured and no pollution reported.

According to Soo Today, a life extension for Algolake was one of the reasons why Algoma Central's profits were down sharply in 2009. The ship was laid up for scrapping in 2018. That year, the vessel was sold, renamed Gola and was later scrapped in July at Aliağa, Turkey.

References 

Great Lakes freighters
Algoma Central Marine
1976 ships
Ships built in Collingwood, Ontario